The Stollé synthesis is a series of chemical reactions that produce oxindoles from anilines and α-haloacid chlorides (or oxalyl chloride).

The first step is an amide coupling, while the second step is a Friedel–Crafts reaction. An improved procedure has been developed.

See also
Indole
Hinsberg oxindole synthesis

References

Carbon-carbon bond forming reactions
Heterocycle forming reactions
Name reactions